The Melton is a building society based in Melton Mowbray, Leicestershire in the East Midlands. The Melton was established in 1875 and is one of the oldest surviving building societies in the United Kingdom with over 65,000 members.  It provides mortgages, savings, insurance and investment products from its principal office and three branches in Melton Mowbray, Oakham and Grantham. The society has a subsidiary, named MBS Lending Limited, which provides mortgage finance to customers who do not meet the criteria to become society members and accounts for approximately 14% of total outstanding loans (December 2015).

The Melton is a mutual organisation owned by its more than 40,000 members.  The Society is a member of the Building Societies Association.

References

External links
The Melton Building Society
Building Societies Association
KPMG Building Societies Database 2008

Building societies of England
Banks established in 1875
Companies based in Leicestershire
1875 establishments in England